DragonSpeed Racing is an American racing team that competes in the European Le Mans Series, FIA World Endurance Championship and the 24 Hours of Le Mans. In 2019, the team entered the NTT IndyCar Series with a five race schedule, including the 103rd Indianapolis 500, with car #81 driven by Ben Hanley. For the Year 2021 24 Hours of Le Mans race, Team DragonSpeed USA won First Place Trophy in the LMP2 Pro/Am Category, in an Oreca 07, car #21, driven by Henrik Hedman, Ben Hanley and Juan Pablo Montoya.

History

First steps
In 2007, DragonSpeed, was founded by racing driver Elton Julian. Four years later the team made their race debut on Ferrari F430 Challenge in the GT category of the 2011 24 Hours of Daytona. They have finished 15th in the category and 29th overall. They missed 2012 racing season, and joined the Prototype Challenge class of the 2013 American Le Mans Series with Oreca FLM09-Chevrolet car. They finished sixth in the season standings, being the only team in the category to participate on the part-time schedule.

Pirelli World Challenge
DragonSpeed switched to the Pirelli World Challenge in 2014 with Henrik Hedman and Mike Hedlund behind the wheel of the Ferrari 458 GT3. Hedman finished ninth in the standings. Hedlund had only three rounds, ending 22nd. For the next year, the team switched to the Mercedes-Benz SLS AMG GT3. Hedlund was replaced by Frank Montecalvo and Eric Lux. Montecalvo won the GTA category title.

Blancpain Endurance Series
The team moved to Europe to compete in the Pro-Am Cup of the 2015 Blancpain Endurance Series. They used Ferrari 458 GT3 and fielded Hedman, Julian and Thomas Kemenater.

European Le Mans Series
In 2016, the team purchased an Oreca 05-Nissan car to compete in the LMP2 class of the European Le Mans Series with Hedman, Ben Hanley and Nicolas Lapierre. They had four podiums in six races, including a win at Spa. This was enough for fourth place in the LMP2 standings.

For 2017 the team bought two Oreca 07-Gibson cars. The car #21 retained the same Hedman-Hanley-Lapierre line-up, while car #22 was branded as G-Drive Racing with Memo Rojas, Léo Roussel as their full-time drivers. Ryō Hirakawa due to his Toyota commitments was forced to miss Red Bull Ring and Circuit Paul Ricard rounds. He was sustained by Nicolas Minassian. The team had their first double, winning Monza round. G-Drive branded car won the series after their five podiums in six races.

The team will continue to stand out car #21 in the LMP2 category of the 2018 European Le Mans Series with the same line-up of drivers (Hedman-Hanley-Lapierre).

FIA World Endurance Championship

DragonSpeed purchased BR Engineering BR1-Gibson car and made their debut in the LMP1 class of the FIA World Endurance Championship in 2018. Their LMP1 squad featured Hendrik Hedman and Ben Hanley, while Pietro Fittipaldi and Renger van der Zande shared third-driver duties. In addition, the team were represented in LMP2 class by Roberto González, Pastor Maldonado, Nathanaël Berthon and Anthony Davidson, who replaced Berthon after the 2018 24 Hours of Le Mans race.

IndyCar

On December 17, 2018, DragonSpeed announced they would join the IndyCar Series in 2019 on a 5-race schedule, including the 103rd Indianapolis 500. The team's No. 81 entry was powered by Chevrolet and driven by Ben Hanley. In their first race, the 2019 Firestone Grand Prix of St. Petersburg, Hanley advanced to the second round of qualifying and qualified 12th, and then finished 18th, 2 laps down, in his IndyCar race debut. The team finished 21st at the 2019 Honda Indy Grand Prix of Alabama. In qualifying for their third IndyCar race at the 103rd Indianapolis 500, the No. 81 struggled for speed early on in the day but finished 27th fastest, confirming DragonSpeed's spot in the field. Hanley would proceed to finish 32nd in the race after a mechanical issue took the team out early. The team was scheduled to participate in 2 further races at Road America and Mid-Ohio, but visa issues prevented the team from getting on track and their inaugural campaign was reduced to 3 races.

In August 2019 team owner Elton Julian stated the team planned on entering ten races in 2020 with Hanley as the driver, with the possibility of additional races. Julian said different drivers could be used if the team were to go beyond the planned ten races, if the right combination of sponsorship and driver talent could be found. In December, an announcement from the team said they had finalized plans to run six races in 2020 – St. Petersburg, Long Beach, Texas, Mid-Ohio, Laguna Seca and the Indy 500, however the COVID-19 pandemic led to the cancellation of the St. Petersburg, Long Beach, Mid-Ohio and Laguna Seca races, and the team did not field an entry for Texas. On August 8, the team announced that Hanley would drive their entry for the Indianapolis 500, which was held on August 23. With little preparation time, the team had numerous mechanical issues in practice, resulting in qualifying in the 33rd and last position. The car finished the race in 23rd place.

On October 28, 2020, the team shuttered their IndyCar Series program and sold their IndyCar assets to Meyer Shank Racing, citing the team "being taken back two years" due to the COVID-19 pandemic. Julian left open the possibility of returning to the series when "the next big thing happens for IndyCar" if the resources were available.

While no one from DragonSpeed was involved, the car that once belonged to the team went on to win the 2021 Indianapolis 500, being driven by Hélio Castroneves for Meyer Shank Racing.

DragonSpeed returned to IndyCar for the 2022 Indianapolis 500, fielding a joint entry with Cusick Motorsports for driver Stefan Wilson. DragonSpeed leased a chassis from A. J. Foyt Enterprises for the entry.

Racing results

IndyCar Series
(key)

* Season still in progress

 In conjunction with Cusick Motorsports

References

External links

 

American auto racing teams
IndyCar Series teams
Auto racing teams established in 2007
2007 establishments in Florida
American Le Mans Series teams
24 Hours of Le Mans teams
European Le Mans Series teams
Blancpain Endurance Series teams
FIA World Endurance Championship teams
WeatherTech SportsCar Championship teams